Kohinoor Akhter (known by her stage name Shuchanda) is a Bangladeshi film actress and director. She started her career in the mid 1960s and acted in about 100 movies. She won Bangladesh National Film Award for Best Director for the film Hajar Bachhor Dhore (2005) and Bangladesh National Film Award for Lifetime Achievement (2019).

Career
Shuchanda debuted in acting with the film Kagojer Nouka (1966), directed by Subhash Dutta.  She acted in films like "Behula" (1966), "Shuorani Duorani" (1968) and "Jibon Theke Neya" (1970) — directed by her future husband Zahir Raihan.

As an actor, Shuchanda won a Nigar Award from Pakistan in 1987 for her role in the film Hum Ek Hain.

In 1985, Shuchanda debuted as a film producer and produced Teen Kanya, Taka Ana Pai and Protishodh, from her production house "Suchanda Cholochitra".

Shuchanda debuted as a director with the film Bidesh Jatra in 1998.

Filmography

Personal life
Shuchanda was married to Zahir Raihan until his disappearance in 1972, immediately after the liberation war of 1972. She has a daughter, Lisa Malik and a son, Arafat Raihan Opu.

Awards
 Standard Chartered-The Daily Star's "Celebrating Life Lifetime Achievement Award" (2017)
 Bangladesh National Film Award for Best Director (2005)
 Nigar Award for Best Actress (1987)
Bangladesh National Film Award for Lifetime Achievement (2019)

References

External links
 

Living people
People from Jessore District
Bangladeshi film actresses
20th-century Bangladeshi actresses
Best Director National Film Award (Bangladesh) winners
Best Film Directing Meril-Prothom Alo Critics Choice Award winners
Best Supporting Actress Bachsas Award winners
National Film Award (Bangladesh) for Lifetime Achievement recipients
1947 births